The Dota 2 Asia Championships 2015, also known as DAC 2015, was a professional Dota 2 tournament that occurred in Shanghai, China from January 5-February 9, 2015 at the Shanghai Grand Stage. It was organized and hosted by Perfect World. The tournament resembled The International, in that there were a number of teams directly invited and that there was a compendium released which contributed to the tournament's prize purse.

The tournament was won by Evil Geniuses. Sixteen teams competed in the tournament. Eight teams received direct invitations, they were Vici Gaming, LGD Gaming, Newbee, Invictus Gaming, Team Secret, Evil Geniuses, MVP Phoenix, and Rave. The rest of the teams were determined through qualifiers held for America, Europe, Asia, and a wildcard. The qualified teams through wildcard were TongFu.WanZhou, CDEC Gaming, EHOME, Big God, Cloud9, HellRaisers, Natus Vincere, and HyperGloryTeam.

There was a legal dispute between Huomao TV and Douyu TV over streaming rights for the tournament.

Results

References

Dota competitions
2015 in esports
Esports competitions in China
2010s in Shanghai
2015 in Chinese sport
Perfect World competitions